Robert James Brown may refer to:
 Bob Brown (born 1944), Australian politician, medical doctor and environmentalist, leader of the Australian Greens
 Bob Brown (Australian Labor politician) (1933–2022)
 Robert James Brown (moderator) (1792–1872), Scottish minister
 Robert Brown (British actor) (1921–2003)

See also
 Robert Brown (disambiguation)